Eucalyptus luehmanniana, commonly known as the yellow top mallee ash, is a species of mallee that is endemic to a small area in New South Wales. It has smooth white bark, lance-shaped to curved adult leaves, flower buds in groups of between seven and eleven or more, white flowers and cup-shaped, urn-shaped or barrel-shaped fruit. It has a restricted distribution on poor, rocky soils near Sydney.

Description
It has smooth white to brown  bark that is shed in long ribbons. Flowering occurs between June and December and the flowers are white.

This mallee has sometimes been confused with the tree species E. haemastoma and E. stricta.

Taxonomy and naming
Eucalyptus luehmanniana was first formally described in 1878 by Ferdinand von Mueller in Fragmenta phytographiae Australiae. The type specimen was collected in sandy rocky ground by William Kirton, "eight miles north of Bulli at an elevation of 2000 feet".The specific epithet honours Johann George Luehmann, who was Mueller's assistant in the Melbourne Herbarium.

Distribution and habitat
The yellow top mallee ash grows in mallee heath on shallow soils derived from sandstone on the coastal plateau in the Sydney region, between the Hawkesbury River and Bulli. Despite having a restricted distribution, it is locally abundant.

Culture
The fruit of this eucalypt was depicted on the original five dollar note, beside a drawing of Joseph Banks.

References 

luehmanniana
Myrtales of Australia
Flora of New South Wales
Mallees (habit)
Plants described in 1878
Taxa named by Ferdinand von Mueller